The 25th Central American and Caribbean Games are scheduled to take place in 2026 in Santo Domingo, Dominican Republic.

References

Central American and Caribbean Games
Central American and Caribbean Games
Central American and Caribbean Games 2026